The TESOL Journal is a quarterly peer-reviewed academic journal covering current theory and research in the field of teaching English to speakers of other languages (TESOL). It is published by Wiley-Blackwell on behalf of TESOL International Association. The journal was formerly edited by Kanavillil Rajagopalan (University of Campinas) and  Margo DelliCarpini (The City University of New York). The current editor-in-chief (2015-2018) is Joy Egbert (Washington State University).

See also
TESOL Quarterly

External links

Wiley-Blackwell academic journals
English-language journals
Publications established in 1992
Quarterly journals
Linguistics journals
English as a second or foreign language